The Daniels & Fisher Tower is a distinctive historic landmark located in Denver, Colorado.

Description and history 

Built as part of the Daniels & Fisher department store in 1910, it was the tallest building between the Mississippi River and the state of California at the time of construction, at a height of 325 feet (99 m). The building was designed by the architect Frederick Sterner and modeled after The Campanile (St. Mark's Bell Tower) at the Piazza San Marco in Venice, Italy. The 20-floor clock tower has clock faces on all four sides. May Company purchased Daniels & Fisher in 1958, and the store vacated the tower. When the store was demolished (ca. 1971), the tower was saved and renovated into residential and office space in 1981. A 2½ ton bell occupies the top two floors of the building, above the observation deck.

The tower is located within Denver's Skyline Park and the basement level has been home to the Clocktower Cabaret entertainment venue since 2006.

The tower was listed on the National Register of Historic Places on December 3, 1969.

Gallery

See also
 May-Daniels & Fisher
 Yule marble

References

External links

Building info at emporis.com
Only in Colorado
The Clocktower Cabaret

Colorado State Register of Historic Properties
Towers completed in 1911
Towers in Colorado
National Register of Historic Places in Denver
Clock towers in Colorado
Bell towers in the United States
Commercial buildings on the National Register of Historic Places in Colorado
Department stores on the National Register of Historic Places
Skyscraper office buildings in Denver
Residential skyscrapers in Denver
1911 establishments in Colorado